Anápolis Futebol Clube, known simply as Anápolis, are a Brazilian football team based in Anápolis, Goiás. They competed in the Campeonato Brasileiro Parallel Tournament in 1986 and in the Série C in 2008.

History
They were founded on 1 May 1946 as União Esportiva Operária, changing the name to Anápolis Futebol Clube five years later, after Anápolis Sport Club became defunct. The club won the Campeonato Goiano in 1965. Anápolis competed in the Campeonato Brasileiro Parallel Tournament in 1986, when they were eliminated in the first stage after finishing in the fourth place of their group. Anápolis competed in the Série C in 2008, when they were eliminated in the first stage, after finishing in their group's third place.

Stadium
Anápolis play their home games at Estádio Jonas Duarte. The stadium has a maximum capacity of 20,000 people.

Achievements

 Campeonato Goiano:
 Winners (1): 1965
 Campeonato Goiano Second Level:
 Winners (2): 1990, 2012

Rivalry
Anápolis has a rivalry with Associação Atlética Anapolina.

References

 
Association football clubs established in 1946
Football clubs in Goiás
1946 establishments in Brazil